Guy Akpagba (born 5 May 1990) is Beninese footballer who plays for Dragons which is playing in the Benin Premier League. He was called to Benin national football team at the 2012 Africa Cup of Nations.

International career

International goals
Scores and results list Benin's goal tally first.

References

External links 
 
  Profile
  Profile

Living people
Beninese footballers
Benin international footballers
AS Dragons FC de l'Ouémé players
Association football defenders
People from Cotonou
1990 births